In mathematics, advanced calculus can refer to
Multivariable calculus
Mathematical analysis; specifically, real analysis
A calculus that goes beyond multivariable calculus; for this, see Calculus on Euclidean space